Qadamgah-e Morteza Ali (also Romanized as Qadamgāh-e Morteza’ ‘Alī and Qadamgāh-e Morteẕá ‘Alī; also known as Qadamqāh-e Morteza’ ‘Alī) is a village in Borj-e Akram Rural District, in the Central District of Fahraj County, Kerman Province, Iran. At the 2006 census, its population was 314, in 62 families.

References 

Populated places in Fahraj County